Reckoning Night is the fourth full-length studio album by the Finnish power metal band Sonata Arctica, as well as the first to feature keyboardist Henrik Klingenberg. The track "Don't Say a Word" continues the so called Caleb saga, a series of songs that started on Silence's "The End of This Chapter" and is continued on Unia's "Caleb", The Days of Grays's "Juliet", The Ninth Hour's "Till Death's Done Us Apart" and Talviyö's "The Last of the Lambs".

Track listing

The hidden track "Jam" is on all albums, but is often mistaken for the Japanese/Korean-only bonus track "Wrecking the Sphere". "Jam" is a jammed Flamenco-style tune (as the name implies) and is significantly shorter than "Wrecking the Sphere", which is a typical song.
Also released as limited and numbered seabag (1,000 copies, available only per Nuclear Blast mailorder) with digipack CD, T-Shirt and gimmicks.

Personnel
Tony Kakko – Vocals
Jani Liimatainen – Guitars
Henrik Klingenberg – Keyboards, Deep/harsh backing vocals (on "Wildfire")
Marko Paasikoski – Bass
Tommy Portimo – Drums
 Nik Van-Eckmann – Male voice (on "Don't Say a Word", "White Pearl, Black Oceans..." and "Wildfire")

Charts

Certifications

References

Sonata Arctica albums
2004 albums
Nuclear Blast albums